Frigyes Mezei (né Friedrich Wiesner; 26 September 1887, Mór – 22 March 1938, Budapest) was a Hungarian athlete. He competed at the 1908 Summer Olympics in London and at the 1912 Summer Olympics in Stockholm.

Mezei was a member of the Hungarian medley relay team that eon a bronze medal. He was the second runner on the squad, running 200 metres. He followed Pál Simon and was followed by József Nagy and Ödön Bodor.

Mezei gave Nagy a six-yard lead over the Swedish team in the first round, but Nagy was unable to hold on to it. He made the transfer to Bodor while three yards behind. Bodor was able to regain the lead in the second half of the race to keep the Hungarians in the competition. In the final, Nagy was able to make the transfer to Bodor while five yards ahead of the German runners, though hopelessly behind the dominant American team. This time it was Bodor who was passed, and the Hungarians finished third.

In the 100 metres, Mezei placed fourth out of five in his first round heat to be eliminated without advancing to the semifinals. He was also eliminated in his preliminary heat of the 200 metres, placing second of three with a time of 24.0 seconds.

References

Sources
 
 
 

1887 births
1938 deaths
People from Mór
Hungarian male sprinters
Olympic athletes of Hungary
Athletes (track and field) at the 1908 Summer Olympics
Athletes (track and field) at the 1912 Summer Olympics
Olympic bronze medalists for Hungary
Medalists at the 1908 Summer Olympics
Olympic bronze medalists in athletics (track and field)
Sportspeople from Fejér County